Barhan is a  town  in Etmadpur tehsil, Agra district, Uttar Pradesh, India, located at 30 km from the city of Agra. It's primarily populated by Thakurs, Jain, Jadaun, Gautam, Baghel, Barbar, Kushwaha, Ahirs, Scheduled Castes and a few other communities.

Population
Barhan's population is 17365. Out of this, 9322 are males while the females count 8043 here. This village has 2554 kids in the age group of 0–6 years. Out of this 1393 are boys and 1161 are girls.

Education 
There are many educational institutes in the Town.

The main colleges of Barhan is:
 Dev Education Degree College
 Rastriya Inter College
 Kishori Devi Kanya Inter College
Sarswati Gyan Mandir High School 
Maa Bhagwati Public School
R B Public School 
Mother Public School
Adarsh vidhya niketan 
Dev public school

Literacy rate 
Literacy ratio in Barhan village is 66%. 11604 out of total 17365 population is literate here. In males the literacy ratio is 74% as 6971 males out of total 9322 are educated whereas female literacy ratio is 57% as 4633 out of total 8043 females are educated in this Village.

Transport

Air 
It is located just 28 km from Agra airport.

Road 
Barhan is well connected with road transport. There are two ways to connect Agra city, first one via NH2 (Delhi to Kolkata ) at  Etmadpur and second one is via Agra Jalesar Road at  Anwalkheda.

Rail 
Barhan Railway Station is on the North Central Railway zone line between Delhi and Howrah and Junction ( Etah Railway station line start from here) 

Agra cant railway station and Agra fort railway station are about 30km from Barhan Railway Station 

Tundla Junction railway station  is 16 km from Barhan

Worship Place 
Barhan has worship places for all community such as jain, Hindus and Muslims
 Shri Bankey Bihari Mandir is a Hindu temple dedicated to Lord Krishna
Shree Adinath Digambar Jain Mandir
 Shree Digambar Jain Parashnath Mandir
 Hanuman Mandir 
 Devi Mata madir 
 Jama majid

Police Station 
Barhan has its own Police station 

 Police station Near moon light market opp. Ram leela ground  Barhan Agra

Fire Station 
Barhan has its own Fire Station 

 Fire Station Near tyagi market Barhan  Agra

Post Station 
Barhan has its own Post Office 

 Sub Post Office Moon Light Market Barhan Agra

References 

Villages in Agra district